Helen Kaye Ledgerwood AM (4 June 1945 – 29 October 2019), born Helen Kaye Dening, was an Australian businesswoman and international tennis player.

Dening was a top junior player, winning girls' singles titles at the 1962 French Championships and 1964 Australian Championships. She also reached the women's singles semi-finals of the 1963 Australian Championships.

Graduating from the University of Sydney in 1967, Dening became a business executive and was honoured in 1995 with a Member of the Order of Australia (AM) "in recognition of service to the building industry".

References

External links
 

1945 births
2019 deaths
Australian female tennis players
Australian women business executives
Members of the Order of Australia
University of Sydney alumni
Grand Slam (tennis) champions in girls' singles
Australian Championships (tennis) junior champions
French Championships junior (tennis) champions
Medalists at the 1967 Summer Universiade
Universiade gold medalists for Australia
Universiade medalists in tennis